The Forest of Marston Vale is an evolving community forest in Marston Vale, which runs south west from the towns of Bedford and Kempston in Bedfordshire, England towards the M1 motorway. It is operated by a registered charity called the Forest of Marston Vale Trust.

The vale is traditionally a brickmaking area, but brickmaking industry has been running down since the 1970s. It has left a large amount of spoiled countryside containing several large empty pits some of which have now been converted into lakes. The Forest of Marston Vale is one of twelve of community forest projects in the United Kingdom. It was initiated by the Countryside Agency and the Forestry Commission, in partnership with Bedfordshire County Council, Mid Bedfordshire District Council, and Bedford Borough Council. The total area covered is 61 square miles (158 km2), but most of this land is in private ownership. There are incentives for landowners to plant trees, and the target for community forests in general is to reach 30% tree cover.

The principal public open space in the Forest is Marston Vale is the Millennium Country Park which covers 2.5 km2 (1 mile2) and was opened in 2000. The park features several lakes including the large Stewartby Lake and extensive wetlands. There is a visitor centre called the Forest Centre, which has a Lakeside Cafe, shop, toilets and bike rental. According to the official website the park attracts around a quarter of a million visitors a year.

On 26 January 2018, the UK Environmental Agency granted a permit to Covanta Energy Limited to operate what will be the UK's largest waste incinerator, next to the Forest. The effect of this development remains to be seen.

See also
 Community Forests in England

References

External links
Official site

Forests and woodlands of Bedfordshire
Parks and open spaces in Bedfordshire